Pseudorhabdosynochus viscosus is a species of diplectanid monogenean that is parasitic on the gills of the camouflage grouper  Epinephelus polyphekadion. It was described in 2011.

Description
Pseudorhabdosynochus viscosus is a relatively small monogenean, 0.6-1.2 mm in length. The species has the general characteristics of other species of Pseudorhabdosynochus, with a flat body and a posterior haptor, which is the organ by which the monogenean attaches itself to the gill of is host. The haptor bears two squamodiscs, one ventral and one dorsal. The sclerotized male copulatory organ, or "quadriloculate organ", has the shape of a bean with four internal chambers, as in other species of Pseudorhabdosynochus.

The vagina includes a sclerotized part, which is a complex structure.

Etymology
The specific epithet of the species, viscosus, Latin for viscous, refers to the abundant mucus produced by the host fish.

Hosts and localities

The type-host and only recorded host of P. viscosus is the camouflage grouper  Epinephelus polyphekadion. The type-locality and only recorded locality is the barrier reef off Nouméa, New Caledonia. 

The camouflage grouper harbours three other species of Pseudorhabdosynochus, namely Pseudorhabdosynochus crassus, Pseudorhabdosynochus dionysos and Pseudorhabdosynochus huitoe.

References 

Diplectanidae
Animals described in 2011
Fauna of New Caledonia